Ill Biskits are an underground hip-hop duo from Petersburg, Virginia.

Ill Biskits released their 1st single on Indie NYC label Khari Entertainment in 1994. The single, "God Bless Your Life" contains the rare and much sought after B-Side track "22 Years", which was produced by Lord Finesse.

In 1995, after getting the attention of major label Atlantic Records, the duo signed an album deal, and went onto to release 2 more singles.

Discography

Albums
Chronicle Of Two Losers: First Edition (1995)

Singles & EPs
God Bless Your Life / 22 Years / Beyond Understanding
Chill Factor

External links 
 https://hiphopdx.com/news/id.20940/title.kleph-dollaz-of-90s-group-ill-biskits-death-confirmed-remembered-by-peers

Underground hip hop groups
Hip hop duos
American musical duos
Musical groups from Virginia